Erhan Dünge (born February 4, 1980 in Turkey) is a Turkish volleyball player. He is 208 cm and plays as middle blocker. He plays for Galatasaray

References

1980 births
Living people
Turkish men's volleyball players
Galatasaray S.K. (men's volleyball) players
Ziraat Bankası volleyball players